Laguna Blanca is a lake in the Hope Ranch area of Santa Barbara County, California, United States. It is surrounded by La Cumbre Golf and Country Club.

See also
 Laguna Blanca School
 List of lakes in California

References

Lakes of California
Bodies of water of Santa Barbara County, California
Santa Barbara, California